Aoife Mannion (born 24 September 1995) is a professional footballer who plays as a centre-back for Manchester United in the Women's Super League and the Republic of Ireland women's national team. She was previously capped for England, the country of her birth, at youth level and received her first senior call-up in August 2019 but never appeared before debuting for Ireland in February 2023. Mannion began her senior club career at Aston Villa before appearing for Birmingham City and Manchester City. She has been named to the PFA WSL Team of the Year twice.

Early years
Mannion was born in Solihull and attended St Peter's Catholic School, where she was a classmate of fellow footballer Jack Grealish. Mannion attended Solihull School sixth form college from 2012 to 2014. Mannion began playing football at the age of six for Celtic Reds under the management of Mark Fogarty, captaining the side to a Warwickshire County League title. In 2006, she left Celtic Reds under-10s to join the Birmingham City Centre of Excellence. Her father would also take her to St Andrew's to watch the Birmingham City men's team play, citing Robbie Savage and Roy Keane as childhood inspirations. Mannion also played Gaelic football growing up.

Club career

Aston Villa
Having joined the Aston Villa Centre of Excellence, Mannion was promoted to the first team in July 2012 by Joe Hunt, who had managed her in the academy. The team played in the second-tier FA Women's Premier League National Division. Mannion made 21 appearances in all competitions as Aston Villa won the 2012–13 FA Women's Premier League Cup, beating Leeds United on penalties in the final.

Birmingham City
Mannion was signed for Birmingham City in August 2013 by David Parker. She made her Birmingham debut on 16 October 2013 against Finnish side PK-35 Vantaa in the first leg of the 2013–14 UEFA Women's Champions League round of 32. Birmingham defeated PK-35 Vantaa 1–0 and advanced to the round of 16. Forging a partnership with Kerys Harrop, Mannion played every minute of the 2014 and 2015 FA WSL seasons, with her performances leading her to be named to the 2015 PFA Women's Young Player of the Year shortlist, but lost out to Leah Williamson. She signed a new contract ahead of the 2016 season. In 2016, Mannion continued her ever-present run, starting all but the final game of the season, ending a run of 44 successive WSL starts. In 2017, Birmingham reached the FA Cup final for the second time in their history. Held at Wembley Stadium, Mannion started the 2017 FA Women's Cup Final as Birmingham lost 4–1 to Manchester City. Under Marc Skinner, Mannion was selected in back to back PFA Team of the Years for 2017–18 and 2018–19, before departing the club when her contract expired on 30 June 2019, declining a new deal to stay at Birmingham.

Manchester City
On 9 July 2019, Manchester City announced the signing of Mannion on a two-year deal ahead of the 2019–20 season. She made her competitive debut for City on 7 September 2019, starting in the season opener as City beat Manchester United 1–0 in the first professional women's Manchester derby in front of a then-record 31,213 crowd. She scored her first goal for the club on 12 September 2019, a penalty in a 7–1 Champions League round of 32 first leg victory against Swiss side Lugano. Mannion injured her anterior cruciate ligament in a Champions League game against Atlético Madrid on 19 October 2019. The injury kept her out for 16 months, finally making a return to play as a 72nd-minute substitute in a 4–0 win over her former side Birmingham City on 28 February 2021, 498 days since her last appearance. She made her first start since the injury against Tottenham Hotspur on 4 April 2021, stepping in for the withdrawing Alex Greenwood having originally been named as a substitute. She played the full 90 minutes as City won 3–0. Mannion left Manchester City at the end of the 2020–21 season upon the expiration of her contract having made 11 appearances in all competitions.

Manchester United
On 26 July 2021, Mannion signed a two-year contract with Manchester United. On 2 February 2022, Mannion suffered a second ACL injury. After 11 months out, she made her first appearance following her recovery in a midseason friendly against Birkirkara in Malta in January 2023.

International career
Mannion is eligible to represent both England, as the country of her birth, and Ireland, where both her parents are from.

England
Mannion represented England at under-15, under-17, under-19, under-20 and under-23 level. She played during 2011 and 2012 UEFA Women's Under-17 Championship qualification as England reached the second round both times but failed to make the finals.

Mannion was called-up to represent England at the 2012 and 2013 UEFA Women's Under-19 Championship. She played every minute as England reached the final of the latter before losing to France. Despite the loss, the result qualified the team for the 2014 FIFA U-20 Women's World Cup in Canada. Mannion again played every minute as draws against South Korea and Mexico before defeat against Nigeria saw the team finish third in the group and eliminated.

In May 2015, Mannion was named to the under-23 team for the Nordic Tournament. In March 2016, she played for the under-23 team at the La Manga tournament.

In August 2019, Mannion received her first senior England call-up for friendlies against Belgium and Norway but did not make an appearance. She was recalled to the squad for the following set of fixtures against Portugal and Brazil but was again an unused substitute in both games.

Republic of Ireland
In February 2023, Mannion was named to the Republic of Ireland squad by Vera Pauw for a friendly against China having opted to switch her international eligibility. She made her senior international debut on 22 February, starting and playing 70 minutes of a 0–0 draw with China.

Career statistics

Club

International
Statistics accurate as of match played 22 February 2023.

Honours
Aston Villa
FA Women's National League Cup winner: 2012–13

Birmingham City
FA Women's League Cup runner-up: 2016
Women's FA Cup runner-up: 2016–17

Manchester City
FA Women's Super League runner-up: 2019–20, 2020–21

England
UEFA Women's Under-19 Championship runner-up: 2013

Individual
FA WSL Team of the Year: 2017–18, 2018–19

References

External links
Profile at TheFA.com

Living people
1995 births
English women's footballers
Women's association football defenders
Women's Super League players
Birmingham City W.F.C. players
Manchester City W.F.C. players
Manchester United W.F.C. players
Sportspeople from Solihull
Republic of Ireland women's international footballers